Jo McCaw (born 28 June 1983 in Oamaru, New Zealand) is a New Zealand netball player. McCaw was a member of the Canterbury Flames in the National Bank Cup, and played for the Canterbury side again (under the new name of the Canterbury Tactix) in the inaugural season of the ANZ Championship. As of September 2010, McCaw continues to play with Canterbury in the National Provincial Championship. Her older brother Richie McCaw is captain of the Crusaders and New Zealand All Blacks rugby teams.

References

New Zealand netball players
Mainland Tactix players
Sportspeople from Oamaru
1983 births
Living people
ANZ Championship players
Canterbury Flames players